Roeland, Roelandt or Roelant (all pronounced ) is a Dutch masculine given name equivalent to English Roland. It is a Germanic name consisting of the elements -hrod- ("fame") and -land- (i.e. "famous in the land") or -nand- ("brave"). A common short form is Roel. People with the name include:

Roeland van Duijn (born 1943), Dutch politician, political activist and writer
 (born 1940), Dutch movie director
Roeland van Laer (1598 – aft. 1635), Dutch landscape painter
Roeland Lievens (born 1983), Dutch rower
 (born 1967), Dutch astronomer, NASA space telescope project leader
Roeland Nusse (born 1950), Dutch developmental biologist
Roelant Oltmans (born 1954), Dutch hockey coach
 (born 1970), Dutch archaeologist
Roeland Pruijssers (born 1989), Dutch chess grandmaster
Roeland Raes (born 1934), Belgian politician
Roelant Roghman (1627–1692), Dutch painter, sketcher and engraver
Roelant Savery (1576–1639), Dutch still life and bird  painter
Roeland Schaftenaar (born 1988), Dutch basketball player
Roeland J. in 't Veld (born 1942), Dutch public administration scholar
Roeland Vertegaal (born 1968), Dutch-Canadian computer interface designer
Roeland Wiesnekker (born 1967), Swiss actor

See also
Roeland Park, town in Kansas, US named after John Roe (Roe-land)
Roland (disambiguation)
Rowland (disambiguation)

References

Dutch masculine given names